Ewa Pihl Krabbe (born 1947) is a Swedish politician. She was elected as Member of the Riksdag in September 2022. She represents the constituency of Skåne Northern and Eastern. She is affiliated with the Social Democrats.

References 

Living people
1947 births
Place of birth missing (living people)
21st-century Swedish politicians
21st-century Swedish women politicians
Members of the Riksdag 2022–2026
Members of the Riksdag from the Social Democrats
Women members of the Riksdag